Joseph Rowe III (born December 8, 1973) is a former American football cornerback who played one season for the St Louis Rams in 1997. He also played for the Scottish Claymores in 1999.

References

1973 births
St. Louis Rams players
Virginia Cavaliers football players
American football cornerbacks
Living people
Sportspeople from Queens, New York
Players of American football from New York City